Stanstead Abbotts (alternatively Stanstead Abbots) is a village and civil parish in the district of East Hertfordshire, Hertfordshire, England; it lies on the county boundary with Essex. At the 2001 census, the parish had a population of 1,983. The village is separated from the village of Stanstead St Margarets by the River Lea.

History

Name and origins
The village's name was recorded as "Stanstede" at the time of the Domesday Survey in the late eleventh century. In the twelfth century the manor passed to the abbot of Waltham Holy Cross. By the fourteenth century the suffix "Abbatis", "Abbotts" or "Abbot" formed part of the parish's name. The abbey continued possession of the manor until its dissolution in 1531.

The manor of Stanstead Abbotts was granted to Anne Boleyn and remained with the crown after her execution. In 1559 Queen Elizabeth granted it to Edward Baeshe and it remained in the Bashe family for several generations.

The village
Once situated on the main A414, Stanstead Abbotts has many old buildings in its High Street, although many have now made way for newer residential properties. The village is on the Hertford East Branch Line, with trains from St Margarets station to Liverpool Street Station. The main industry in the village used to be making ale but many of the original maltings have now been demolished to make way for a small business park.

The main entrance to the All Nations Christian College in Stanstead Abbotts was used as the entrance to the school in the "St Trinians" films.

The local school is St Andrews Primary CE (VC) Primary School.

The Lee Valley Marina, part of the Lee Valley Park, is located to the south of the village on the River Lea.

The village was awarded the title "Best kept village in Hertfordshire – large village" in 1999.

Several bus routes run through or near the village, including buses to Harlow, Hunsdon, Hertford, Cheshunt, and Waltham Cross.

Sport and leisure
The village has a Scout Group, the 1st Stanstead Abbotts & St. Margaret's Scout Group.

Stanstead Abbotts has a Non-League football club St. Margaretsbury F.C., which plays at The Recreation Ground.

See also
St James' Church, Stanstead Abbotts
Stanstead Lock, River Lea
The Hundred Parishes
Stanstead St Margarets

References

External links

 The Hundred Parishes

Villages in Hertfordshire
Civil parishes in Hertfordshire
East Hertfordshire District